Marek Wasiluk (born 3 June 1987 in Białystok) is a Polish retired footballer who played as a centre-back.

Career 

Wasiluk started his career with Jagiellonia Białystok.

Honours 

Śląsk Wrocław
Ekstraklasa: 2011–12

Career

Club
In June 2011, he was loaned to Śląsk Wrocław on a half year deal.

After joining Chrobry Głogów in the summer 2018, Wasiluk left Chrobry Głogów on 27 August 2019. On 27 September 2019, he joined Olimpia Zambrów.

References

External links
 
 

1987 births
Living people
Sportspeople from Białystok
Polish footballers
Association football defenders
Jagiellonia Białystok players
MKS Cracovia (football) players
Śląsk Wrocław players
Widzew Łódź players
Chrobry Głogów players
Olimpia Zambrów players
Ekstraklasa players
I liga players
III liga players